Nebojša Krupniković (born 15 August 1973) is a Serbian former professional footballer who played as an attacking midfielder.

Club career
Born in Arilje, Krupniković started out at Red Star Belgrade, making his first senior appearances during the 1991–92 season. He went on loan to Greek club Panionios in 1993–94 in what would be his breakthrough season. After returning from loan, Krupniković established himself as the team's leader, helping them win the double in 1994–95. He was also instrumental in winning another national cup the following year.

In the summer of 1996, Krupniković was transferred abroad to Belgian side Standard Liège. He left the club over the next winter and went to Asia by signing with Japanese side Gamba Osaka. After spending two seasons in the Far East, Krupniković returned to Europe and joined French club Bastia in early 1999.

Between 1999 and 2008, Krupniković played for four clubs in Germany, aside from one year with JEF United Chiba in Japan. He is best remembered for his time at Hannover 96, helping them win promotion to the Bundesliga in 2002.

International career
Despite enjoying success at club level, Krupniković failed to make his international debut for Serbia and Montenegro (previously known as FR Yugoslavia). He was only capped for Yugoslavia at youth level.

Career statistics

Honours
Red Star Belgrade
 First League of FR Yugoslavia: 1994–95
 FR Yugoslavia Cup: 1994–95, 1995–96

Hannover 96
 2. Bundesliga: 2001–02

JEF United Chiba
 J.League Cup: 2006

References

External links
 
 

2. Bundesliga players
Arminia Bielefeld players
Association football midfielders
Belgian Pro League players
Bundesliga players
Chemnitzer FC players
Expatriate footballers in Belgium
Expatriate footballers in France
Expatriate footballers in Germany
Expatriate footballers in Greece
Expatriate footballers in Japan
First League of Serbia and Montenegro players
FK Bor players
FK Radnički Beograd players
Panionios F.C. players
Gamba Osaka players
Hannover 96 players
J1 League players
JEF United Chiba players
Ligue 1 players
People from Arilje
Red Star Belgrade footballers
SC Bastia players
SC Paderborn 07 players
Serbia and Montenegro expatriate footballers
Serbia and Montenegro expatriate sportspeople in Belgium
Serbia and Montenegro expatriate sportspeople in France
Serbia and Montenegro expatriate sportspeople in Germany
Serbia and Montenegro expatriate sportspeople in Greece
Serbia and Montenegro expatriate sportspeople in Japan
Serbia and Montenegro footballers
Serbian expatriate footballers
Serbian expatriate sportspeople in Germany
Serbian expatriate sportspeople in Japan
Serbian footballers
Standard Liège players
Super League Greece players
Yugoslav First League players
Yugoslav footballers
1973 births
Living people